Besart Abdurahimi (born 31 July 1990) is a Macedonian-Croatian footballer of Albanian descent currently playing for Pafos in the Cypriot First Division on loan from Akritas Chlorakas.

Early life
Abdurahimi was born in 1990 in Zagreb, Croatia to  Albanian parents from Gradec, Vrapčište in North Macedonia, who had moved there five years earlier.

Club career
In March 2016, Abdurahimi joined FC Astana on loan.

In October 2020, Abdurahimi returned to Croatia to join second-tier NK Rudeš in his hometown of Zagreb.

On 30 September 2022, Pafos announced the signing of Abdurahimi on loan from Akritas Chlorakas.

International career
In February 2014 the Albanian media wrote about him as a good alternative for Albania's attack, since he is an ethnic Albanian.
On 14 May 2014 Besart had received a call up by the Macedonia national football team for the matches against Cameroon and Qatar on 26–30 May 2014. He had accepted the call up and will represent Macedonia at the international level. He made his debut on 26 May 2014 against Cameroon. He scored his first international "winning" goal in the 92nd minute in their 3-2 win against Luxembourg on 9 October 2014.

International goals
Scores and results list Macedonia's goal tally first.

References

External links
Profile at MacedonianFootball.com 

1990 births
Living people
Footballers from Zagreb
Croatian people of Albanian descent
Croatian people of Macedonian descent
Albanian footballers from North Macedonia
Association football wingers
Macedonian footballers
North Macedonia international footballers
Croatian footballers
Croatia youth international footballers
Croatia under-21 international footballers
NK Zagreb players
Hapoel Tel Aviv F.C. players
K.S.C. Lokeren Oost-Vlaanderen players
FC Astana players
Cerezo Osaka players
Cerezo Osaka U-23 players
KF Shkëndija players
FK Partizani Tirana players
FC Hermannstadt players
NK Bravo players
NK Rudeš players
Akritas Chlorakas players
Pafos FC players
Croatian Football League players
Israeli Premier League players
Belgian Pro League players
Kazakhstan Premier League players
J2 League players
J3 League players
Macedonian First Football League players
Kategoria Superiore players
Liga I players
Slovenian PrvaLiga players
Cypriot First Division players
Croatian expatriate footballers
Macedonian expatriate footballers
Expatriate footballers in Israel
Expatriate footballers in Belgium
Expatriate footballers in Kazakhstan
Expatriate footballers in Japan
Expatriate footballers in Albania
Expatriate footballers in Romania
Expatriate footballers in Slovenia
Expatriate footballers in Cyprus
Croatian expatriate sportspeople in Israel
Croatian expatriate sportspeople in Belgium
Croatian expatriate sportspeople in Kazakhstan
Croatian expatriate sportspeople in Japan
Croatian expatriate sportspeople in Albania
Croatian expatriate sportspeople in Romania
Croatian expatriate sportspeople in Slovenia
Croatian expatriate sportspeople in Cyprus
Macedonian expatriate sportspeople in Israel
Macedonian expatriate sportspeople in Belgium
Macedonian expatriate sportspeople in Kazakhstan
Macedonian expatriate sportspeople in Japan
Macedonian expatriate sportspeople in Albania
Macedonian expatriate sportspeople in Romania
Macedonian expatriate sportspeople in Slovenia
Macedonian expatriate sportspeople in Cyprus